Ichangia is an extinct genus of redlichiid trilobites of the family Protolenidae. It lived during the early part of the Botomian stage of the Cambrian Period, which lasted from approximately 524 to 518.5 million years ago in Hubei and Henan Provinces, China.

References

Redlichiida genera
Cambrian trilobites
Prehistoric animals of China